Rodgers Forge is a national historic district southwest of the unincorporated Towson area and county seat of Baltimore County, Maryland, United States, just north of the Baltimore City/County line. It is mostly a residential area, with rowhouses, apartments, single-family dwellings, and a new complex of luxury townhomes. The area also has a small amount of commercial development. It is just south of Towson University. 21212 is the postal code for Rodgers Forge.

In 2004, Rodgers Forge gained international attention as the home of Olympic swimming champion Michael Phelps. In 2013, Rodgers Forge was ranked by Baltimore Magazine as one of the top neighborhoods in Baltimore County. The magazine also named Rodgers Forge as one of the 10 "best-kept secret neighborhoods" in Baltimore metropolitan area for its "strong public schools, thriving community organizations, and easy access to shopping and entertainment in Baltimore and Towson." Rodgers Forge has also been consistently ranked as one of the safest Baltimore neighborhoods, according to the website and online database NeighborhoodScout. In 2019, Rodgers Forge became the first neighborhood group in Maryland to file to remove racist language from historic deeds.

History

Most of the Rodgers Forge community geographic area, as stated in the Rodgers Forge Community Association, Inc. by-laws, was part of Dumbarton Farm, which as late as 1837 was owned by Johns Hopkins.  This Johns Hopkins died in August 1837, while Johns Hopkins known as a benefactor to Johns Hopkins University and Johns Hopkins Hospital was 42 years of age at the time of the older Johns Hopkins' death.  There are some unfounded claims that link the Hopkins benefactor to Dumbarton Farm.  While other accounts do not specifically identify the Johns Hopkins.

Rodgers Forge takes its name from the blacksmith shop of George Rodgers, built in 1800, that was once on the southeast corner of York Road and Stevenson Lane.—the present day location of an automotive repair garage.  The blacksmith shop acquired an additional function as a U.S. post office, and thus the surrounding area became known as Rodgers Forge.  For example, in 1923, The Country Club of Maryland was founded as The Rodgers Forge Country Club. The names Rodgers Forge Golf Club and Rodgers Forge Golf Course were also used interchangeably.

In 1934, builder James Keelty (Sr.) began work on the Rodgers Forge neighborhood, and constructed over 600 red brick rowhouses until World War II stopped development. After the war, work resumed under the direction of Keelty's two son's James Keelty Jr. and Joseph Keelty.  1,777 homes were completed by 1956. In 1939, the price of a new interior row home was five thousand dollars, with end-of-group homes selling for considerably more. Many of these homes were sold with deeds including covenants that prohibited Black people from living there—with one exception: "No person of any race other than the white race shall use or occupy any building or lot except domestic servants."

The latter phase of construction saw the removal of a large hill just to the north of Dunkirk Road (through Murdock and Regester), flattening out to the north much of the original Dumbarton Farm down to subsoil, to accommodate the new row homes and apartments. The lack of topsoil - a frequent complaint of would-be gardeners in the neighborhood - is accounted for by the removal of the hill. During World War II, the neighborhood's "Victory Gardens" had occupied much of what now comprises Murdock Road, to the north of Dunkirk.

Despite the population density of Rodgers Forge, until the early 1960s, just to the west, a small working farm of a few acres with livestock remained at the junction of Stevenson Lane and Bellona Avenue. Just to the north in the same time period, the then operating Maryland and Pennsylvania Railroad, affectionately known as the "Ma & Pa" (handling commuters in its last years on the Maryland section), crossed under Bellona  at Armagh Village, the track bordering Stanmore Road to the north, as the line wended eastwards toward Towson, continuing across the future Osler Drive, approximately where the Shepherd Flag Station would have been located. From just south of the old Baltimore County Jail, the Ma & Pa made its way toward York, PA, crossing York Road by trestle, serving both the headquarters of Black & Decker and Bendix Radio on Joppa Road, the latter of which up to the 1960s had as many as 5,000 employees, a surprising number of whom lived in Rodgers Forge, as the development of Dulaney Valley to the north was yet to occur. North of Joppa - north of the Immaculate Conception Catholic Church - there was virtually no development save farmland in the Loch Raven watershed, all the way to the Mason and Dixon Line, until Interstate 83 was officially completed in 1960. Also in the 1950s, from Bellona Avenue to Charles Street, a large tract of meadow had extended still, evolving to a retirement facility for a religious order of the Catholic Church in the 1960s, later sold for development.

It is difficult to comprehend, given Rodgers Forge's current surrounding environs, how spectacularly unusual the neighborhood was in its earliest iteration - and in many respects, removed from the experiences of most Baltimoreans who had grown up in city row homes. In the 1940s people thought they were moving to "the country." On a clear October day, looking northward from The Immaculate Conception, across the expanse of slightly rolling, green and brown fields, accentuated by the occasional scurrying of rabbits, York Road's concrete 2-lane meandered north into the nothingness of Pennsylvania and - if you were lucky - one could catch a sapphire glimmer of Loch Raven through the yellow, gold, and browning autumn leaves.

Since shopping centers were nonexistent on the East Coast before 1960, residents of Rodgers Forge were limited to patronizing small retailers on York Road into Towson, Gittings Avenue at Bellona, Charles Street at Bellona, Belvedere Avenue at York Road, and the large "flagship" stores in downtown Baltimore - Hutzler's, Hochschild Kohn, and The Hecht Company - in short, the traditional opportunities afforded by urban development to the south. Shoppers could ride the York Road "#8 Streetcar" (an electrified trolley on tracks) north into Towson and south all the way into Baltimore; or they could board the #11 Baltimore Transit Co. Bus (Dunkirk, Pinehurst, et al., to Stevenson and Bellona, across from the farmette) for stops to downtown, primarily via Charles Street. There was a brief period when, incredibly, the #11 Bus traversed Dunkirk with parking on both sides of the street. This was possible because many households lacked an automobile, and since the bus didn't run at night, those households with a car had vacant parking spaces during the day, as breadwinners increasingly used autos to get to work - in the era well before the introduction of the SUV. Blue collar workers, as well, were out-the-door by 5:00 a.m. and the Sealtest or Cloverland Farms milk delivery trucks arrived as early as 4:00, long before the first buses started running. Every now and then, the peace and quiet of the night might be interrupted by cursing and the crash of glass, as the milkman dropped a bottle: prompting an obligatory retaliatory phone call to the business office by one of the furious neighbor ladies in the morning, so afflicted.

On the other hand, if you didn't drive, staples could be obtained on your doorstep. The "egg man" came on Fridays from Pennsylvania. The potato chip man (Charles Chips) also from PA at least once a month; "A-rabbers", out of the city, with their horse-drawn carts of Eastern Shore produce, appeared during the summers. The Fuller Brush man came, then Avon started calling; vacuum cleaner salesmen, encyclopedia salesmen, and other vendors might show up at any time. The insurance man appeared when premiums were due and one walked to the bank to transact business with a teller - in times, when indeed, life was far simpler. And when the kids had the flu, mumps, and the chicken pox, Mom waited up until the doctor arrived at the door as late as 9:00 at night.

During the '50s, kids were everywhere on bikes; summer nights of sweaty sleep were unbearable in baking-brick-oven row homes, since nobody had air conditioning in either car or home. In the stillness of the day's waning heat, an occasional Evening Bat, from the barn at the meadow on Charles Street, might flitter overhead. Chasing lightning bugs filled the evenings with delightful pastime and mosquitoes; during the days, yards filled with fragrant and colorful blooms were inundated with butterflies that had spent their caterpillar-lives gorging in nearby meadows, and there were abundant populations of bees and baby birds to watch and grasshoppers to catch. In 1953, if you were lucky enough to be a kid then, you witnessed with wonderment the unfolding of one of Nature's extraordinary and mysterious spectaculars - the emergence of Brood X cicadas: "The Great Eastern Brood" -  true to its 17-year cyclical mandate. Some parents had been suspicious of the insects as possible vectors of poliomyelitis, finally conquered by the Salk vaccine, announced in March of that year. Admittedly, not everyone (certainly not most adults) enjoys millions of large flying insects clinging to everything in sight - only those with childhood memories of that certain place, at that certain point in time.

The postwar expansion of Rodgers Forge owed its genesis, demographics, and character in large part to the residency of a young, upwardly mobile, middle-class mix of blue collar and technical professionals and their burgeoning baby boom families. When the malls finally did come in the mid-1960s with explosive development, as Towson State Teachers College morphed into Towson State College, and St. Joseph Hospital and Greater Baltimore Medical Center consumed vast remaining tracts to the north, all relicts of surrounding rural life and artifacts of the railroad had vanished from Rodgers Forge by 1970.

In 2009, the entire neighborhood of Rodgers Forge was listed in National Register of Historic Places due to "its unique status as a well-preserved example of early to mid-20th Century community design and architecture." According to the official citation:

Today, about 4,000 people live in Rodgers Forge, which is now considered among the Baltimore area's "most sought after locations for families."

Notable people
 Charles Adam Fecher, author and editor who is best known for his works about Jacques Maritain and H.L. Mencken; longtime Rodgers Forge resident
 Charles Eberhart, Director of Neuropathology and Ophthalmic Pathology at Johns Hopkins School of Medicine.
 F. Scott Fitzgerald and Zelda Fitzgerald, American novelist couple who resided in Rodgers Forge during 1932-1933
 William J. Frank, member of the Maryland House of Delegates
 Mary Claire Helldorfer (Elizabeth Chandler), author of New York Times Best Seller Kissed by an Angel
 Ralph H. Hruban, professor of pathology and oncology at the Johns Hopkins University School of Medicine;  a world-renowned expert in the field of pancreatic cancer pathology
 David H. Hubel,  winner of 1981 Nobel Prize in Physiology or Medicine for discoveries on information processing in the visual system; resident of Rodgers Forge in 1950s
 Kevin O'Malley, children's book writer
 Eric D. Goodman, fiction writer and long-term Rodgers Forge resident who actually set scenes from some of his books in the Forge.
 Michael Phelps, American competition swimmer and the most decorated Olympian of all time
 Bayard Turnbull, architect - who lived at La Paix, a Rodgers Forge estate
 Johnny Unitas,  football player; owner of former Golden Arm restaurant in Rodgers Forge
 Henry N. Wagner, one of the pioneering researchers in nuclear medicine

Schools
Baltimore County Public Schools
Rodgers Forge Elementary School
Dumbarton Middle School
Students in Rodgers Forge are also zoned for nearby Towson High School.
Private Schools
Dumbarton House, home of the Baltimore Actors Theatre Conservatory
St. Pius X Catholic School

Major Roads
There are several state roads and other major thoroughfares that run through the Rodgers Forge area. These include:
Charles Street
Bellona Avenue
Stevenson Lane
York Road

See also
Stoneleigh-Rodgers Forge, Maryland, a former Census-designated place enumerated in 1960.

External links

 The History of Rodgers Forge
 Rodgers Forge Community Association
 Rodgers Forge on GoogleMaps
 Plat at the Maryland State Archives Legally Defining Blocks 1,2,3,4 of Rodgers Forge

References 

Unincorporated communities in Baltimore County, Maryland
Unincorporated communities in Maryland
Historic districts in Baltimore County, Maryland
Colonial Revival architecture in Maryland
Tudor Revival architecture in Maryland
Historic districts on the National Register of Historic Places in Maryland
National Register of Historic Places in Baltimore County, Maryland